A Life Force is a 1988 graphic novel by American cartoonist Will Eisner. It is the second book in the Contract with God trilogy, preceded by A Contract with God (1978) and followed by Dropsie Avenue (1995). Like the other titles it's also set in New York City, taking place in the 1930s.

External links 
 
 
 

1988 graphic novels
Books by Will Eisner
Comics set in New York City
Comics set in the 1930s